Elli Riehl (19 December 1902 – 8 September 1977) was an Austrian painter. Her work was part of the painting event in the art competition at the 1948 Summer Olympics.

References

1902 births
1977 deaths
20th-century Austrian painters
Austrian women painters
Olympic competitors in art competitions
People from Villach